Deputat is a surname. Notable people with the surname include:

 Andrei Deputat (born 1992), Ukrainian pair skater
 Jeremy Deputat (born 1976), American photographer